Michalis John Arnaoutis is a Greek professional boxer who challenged for the WBO light welterweight title in 2006. At regional level he held the WBO-NABO light welterweight title from 2004 to 2006 and the IBF-USBA light welterweight title from 2008 to 2009.

Amateur career
He started his involvement with the sport at the age of 12 in AEK and from the first day he loved it and devoted himself to it. As an amateur he won many distinctions. He was the champion of Greece for many years among children, teenagers and men at 57 kg. He has won the Pan-European junior medal, the 1st place in the Acropolis cup, and many other distinctions. He was a member of the national team for 6 years, from 1994 to 2000.

Professional career
In 2001, at the age of 22, he leaves for the USA to realize his biggest dream, to become a professional boxer and conquer the top. Having 10 years of hard work and training in America, his career reached its absolute zenith, winning World Titles. He holds the WBO – NABO and IBF – NSBA World Titles. In 2004 he was voted the most televised boxer by the ShowBox channel. In 2005 he made the best knock out, recognizing it and the ESPN channel. In addition, he was voted the best left-hander in the world by the professional boxing committee statistical service in the United States.

Professional boxing record

References

External links 

Mike Arnaoutis vs Jesse Feliciano (video)
Mike Arnaoutis vs Harrison Cuello (video)

Date of birth missing (living people)
Year of birth missing (living people)
Light-welterweight boxers
Welterweight boxers
Southpaw boxers
Living people
Greek male boxers
People from West Attica
Sportspeople from Attica
Survivor Greece contestants